Sayonara Wild Hearts is a music-based action game created by Swedish developer Simogo and published by Annapurna Interactive. Described as a "pop album video game", Sayonara Wild Hearts follows the story of a heartbroken young woman through a surrealistic landscape. Each level of the game is set to a song, with the player guiding the woman while collecting hearts, avoiding obstacles, and fighting enemies. The game was released for iOS, macOS, Nintendo Switch, PlayStation 4, and tvOS devices in September 2019, for Windows in December 2019, and for Xbox One in February 2020. It was met with positive reviews for its visuals, soundtrack, and gameplay, and nominated for several year-end awards.

Gameplay

Sayonara Wild Hearts is a rhythm game broken into 23 levels. In each level, the player controls the main character as they automatically travel through a surrealistic landscape alongside a pop music soundtrack. The exact mechanics of each level change, but in general the player attempts to guide the character to collect hearts across the level to earn points, while avoiding obstacles. In some levels, the player will be prompted to press a button in time with the soundtrack to make a jump or avoid an obstacle. Other levels may require the player to move a cursor on screen to target a bow-and-arrow weapon to defeat enemies, in a manner similar to Rez. During the levels, the player will encounter different boss encounters, which will incorporate a mix of movement and timed button presses to avoid attacks. The player earns points for hearts collected, timing on button presses, and avoiding obstacles, and are rated on a bronze, silver, or gold rating for each. Should the player hit an obstacle or enemy projectile, they are returned to a checkpoint. If the player fails to clear a section after a few tries, the game provides a means for the player to skip that section, only losing out on possible points that could be earned.

Plot

In an alternate universe watched over by three divine arcana of the Tarot (The High Priestess, The Hierophant, and The Empress), a cursed arcanum named Little Death (Death), and her allies, the Dancing Devils (The Devil), the Howling Moons (The Moon), the Stereo Lovers (The Lovers), and Hermit64 (The Hermit), stole all harmony, and hid it in their hearts. Before the divine arcana began to fade, they created a heroine from the shards of a broken heart.

In a time near the present, there is a young woman whose heart has been violently broken. The heroine that the divine arcana created transforms into a butterfly and flies to the young woman, who is resting in bed. The butterfly transports her to the alternate universe. Riding her longboard along an ethereal highway, she chases the butterfly, and upon capturing it, she transforms into a masked heroine (The Fool).

She then falls through a passage and arrives in a purple and pink city. She summons a motorcycle (Wheel of Fortune), and begins to ride through it. Weaving through cars, trams and buildings, she meets a trio of devil-masked women, the Dancing Devils. They fight on the street, before riding through the city on motorcycles. The heroine chases and defeats each member of the trio in turn, and takes back their hearts. The heroine then travels to a mythical forest. With the help of a white stag (The Emperor), she rides through the forest and meets the Howling Moons, a quartet of wolf-masked gangsters. After she chases them the quartet howls to summon a pack of wolves, and the heroine equips her motorbike with dual automatic guns (Justice and Judgement). The masked quartet jump into a large mechanical cerberus and a battle ensures, but the heroine destroys their mech, and claims the quartet's hearts.

The heroine is then transported to a tower (The Tower), and upon climbing it, is transported to a floating city. She meets and fights a masked foe with a sword (Strength), who splits into female twins, the Stereo Lovers. The twins then snap their fingers to switch up the universe they are in every couple of seconds, but the heroine learns to do the same, and chases the twins through the city. She defeats them on top of a plane and claims their heart, before travelling to a desert. Driving a car (The Chariot) through the night, she meets Hermit64, a foe wearing a virtual reality headset as a mask. The heroine travels into the hermit's virtual reality world (The World), and obtains the heart trapped inside.

Summoning a ship (The Star) to sail across an ocean, she then arrives in a dark and rainy city. There she meets a skull-masked villainess with a scythe, Little Death. The villainess sends flying skulls (The Hanged Man) after the heroine, but she summons a bow (Temperance) and shoots them down, and likewise survives the electrified obstacles in the path (The Sun). She then defeats Little Death, but the foe's heart fragments reassemble into a gigantic final monster. After defeating it, the heroine transforms back into her former self, the young woman. She then imagines herself as each of her former foes, and proceeds to fight each in turn. Instead of defeating them however, she forgives them with a brief kiss. The divine arcana then tell the young woman that she has restored harmony to their world, and wish her farewell. She rides back to her world on her skateboard and arrives slightly older, but right back into her groove.

Development
Simogo had developed several narrative-based mobile games prior to Sayonara, including Year Walk and Device 6. According to studio lead Simon Flesser, they "wanted to make something that was a little more gut than brain", and began brainstorming ideas. An early idea was a sketch of a woman wearing a mask inspired by the teddy girl fad of the 1950s, which they grew out into an experience involving traveling through a dreamscape on motorcycles inspired by the tarot. They initially thought that the music for the game should be surf music, but as they were prototyping the game, they had a playlist of pop music on, which Flesser said immediately set the tone they wanted for the game; artists that inspired the soundtrack included Sia, Chvrches and Carly Rae Jepsen. The game's score was composed by Daniel Olsén and Jonathan Eng, with vocals by Linnea Olsson. While most of the compositions are original, the soundtrack also incorporates portions of Debussy's "Clair de lune".

Controls for the game were important to Simogo, as they had a general philosophy that their games could be played by those that did not normally play video games. They looked back to classic arcade games to consider their control schemes to come up with simple gameplay elements that only had the player manipulating the character with a joystick or through a touchscreen, and a single button press for certain actions, such as jumping or performing fighting moves. With the latter button mechanic, they found this allowed them to include the visual indicators on screen to help let players know the right time to perform these actions, enabling the various choreographed fighting sequences in some levels. Mechanics of some elements were pared down to keep interactions with movement and this button press as simple as possible.

The levels represented a number of disparate ideas they had for the game. Simogo had not considered endless runners as a base, but instead looked to rail shooters such as Sin and Punishment, Space Harrier, and Star Fox which mixed both movement and shooting controls. Other games that inspired levels included WarioWare, Out Run and Osu! Tatakae! Ouendan. Initially the game had included some sections presented in third-person perspective allowing the character to walk around and solve puzzles, but found this slowed down the game. Similarly, mechanics that involved shooting targets in a specific order were also found detrimental to the pacing of the game. Many of the initial concepts were cut or reworked to maintain the simplicity of controls. Ultimately, they wanted the game to play out like a musical album with the songs and levels presented in a specific order to tell their story, but which could be replayed individually or out of order without detriment.

Development of the game took about four years starting in 2015. About midway through, Annapurna Interactive approached Simogo for publishing support, and with their funding, were able to hire two additional programmers to help complete the game's development. Flesser also noted that Annapurna brought some necessary rigor into the development cycle to keep them to schedule. As Simogo neared the end of production, Flesser had been in discussion with Annapurna about how they wished they had someone unexpected to narrate the brief lines they had for the story. When asked who they were thinking of, Flesser threw out Queen Latifah's name, not taking the request seriously. A few weeks later, within a month of release, Annapurna had been able to secure Queen Latifah for a voice recording session, to Flesser's surprise.

Sayonara Wild Hearts was first revealed at The Game Awards 2018 for the Nintendo Switch and other possible platforms. It was later affirmed both for release on the PlayStation 4, as well as a launch title for the Apple Arcade subscription service for macOS, tvOS and iOS devices, with the Switch, PlayStation 4, macOS, tvOS and iOS releases all on 19 September 2019. The game was released for Windows on 12 December 2019 and Xbox One on 25 February 2020.

A limited physical release of the game for both Nintendo Switch and PlayStation 4  was published by iam8bit in early 2020, alongside a double LP release of the soundtrack. A global physical release for the Switch and PlayStation 4 was released on 29 September 2020.

Reception

Sayonara Wild Hearts received "generally favorable reviews" according to review aggregator Metacritic. The game was generally praised for its visuals and soundtrack.

The game's soundtrack was critically acclaimed. PlayStation Universe thought the soundtrack was "absolutely outstanding", and the best soundtrack of any game released in 2019. Edge thought that track "Mine" sounded like "a parallel-universe chart-topper", while "The World We Knew" "a gorgeous, swooning, sigh of a ballad." 

Eurogamer's Christian Donlan enjoyed the game's genre switches, saying "Sayonara Wild Hearts can change suits so often because the rules of the game remain constant". Jenna Stoeber of Polygon thought that Sayonara was "much more style than substance", but that the visuals and soundtrack of the game were strong enough to justify a playthrough.

Nicole Clark of Vice thought that the ending of Sayonara was a departure from the usual hero's journey in a fictive narritive. "Rather than becoming your mask, you abandon it. Rather than becoming someone new and unbreakable you recover to the point of self-acceptance."

Accolades
In addition, several game magazines and websites named Sayonara Wild Hearts among their Games of the Year, including Eurogamer, Polygon, Edge, and Salon. Additionally, Edge gave Sayonara its Best Visual Design award and nominated the game for Best Audio Design in their 2019 awards. Sayonara also won "Apple Arcade Game of the Year" by Apple.

References

2019 video games
Action video games
Annapurna Interactive games
Apple Arcade games
Apple Design Awards recipients
iOS games
LGBT-related video games
Music video games
Nintendo Switch games
PlayStation 4 games
Video games developed in Sweden
Video games featuring female protagonists
Windows games
Xbox One games
BAFTA winners (video games)